Abad Santos may refer to:

 Pedro Abad Santos (1876–1945), Filipino politician
 José Abad Santos (1886–1942), Supreme Court Chief Justice of the Philippines
 Vicente Abad Santos (1916–1993), Supreme Court Associate Justice of the Philippines
 Abad Santos Avenue, Manila, Philippines
 Abad Santos station, Manila, Philippines